Vipin Kasana is an Indian athlete who competes in the Javelin throw. He participated in the 2014 Commonwealth Games which took place in Glasgow, Scotland. At the 2018 Commonwealth Games he finished fifth.

Kasana has a personal best of 82.51 m, recorded in the Czech Republic in 2019.

References

1989 births
Living people
Indian male javelin throwers
Athletes (track and field) at the 2014 Commonwealth Games
Athletes (track and field) at the 2018 Commonwealth Games
Commonwealth Games competitors for India